Thalassematidae is a family of spoonworms in the suborder Echiurida.

Genera
The World Register of Marine Species includes these genera in this family:-

Anelassorhynchus Annandale, 1922
Arhynchite Satô, 1937
Ikedosoma Bock, 1942
Lissomyema Fisher, 1946
Listriolobus Fischer, 1926
Ochetostoma Rüppell & Leuckart, 1828
Thalassema Pallas, 1774

References

Echiurans